WKEX (1430 AM) is a sports formatted broadcast radio station licensed to Blacksburg, Virginia, serving Blacksburg and Montgomery County, Virginia.  WKEX is owned and operated by Baker Family Stations. The Station's flagship local sports program is "The Drive", hosted by veteran radio personality Paul Van Wagoner, alongside Virginia Tech alumni Andrew Alix and producer Nathan Brennan. It also serves as the radio home of Carolina Panthers football and Blacksburg High School athletics. Syndicated daytime programming includes Keyshawn, Jwill and Max, Greeny with Mike Greenberg and The Stephen A. Smith Show.

References

External links
 ESPN Radio Blacksburg Online

1969 establishments in Virginia
Sports radio stations in the United States
ESPN Radio stations
Radio stations established in 1969
KEX